Whit Monday is a 1990 Soviet supernatural drama film directed by Sergey Selyanov.

Plot 
The film tells about a man who involuntarily detonates various objects. To understand the reason and meaning of this, he begins to study the history of his family name.

Cast 
 Yuriy Shevchuk
 Boris Golyatkin
 Gennadiy Garbuk
 Viktor Semyonovsky
 Olga Grigoreva
 Vladimir Zubenko
 Oleg Korchikov
 Stanislav Landgraf
 Vladimir Golovin
 Aleksandr Anisimov

References

External links 
 

1990 films
1990s Russian-language films
Russian science fiction drama films
Soviet science fiction drama films
1990s science fiction drama films
Supernatural drama films